Wasser im Wind (German for "Water in the Wind") is the tenth solo album by keyboardist Hans-Joachim Roedelius, best known for his work with Cluster, Harmonia, and Aquarello.

Recording and release

Wasser im Wind was recorded in 1981 at Roedelius' home studio and completed at Erpelstudio, Vienna, Austria in March, 1982.  It was released by the Schallter label on vinyl in 1982.  Wasser im Wind was the first Roedelius album released by a label other than Sky Records since his second solo album, Jardin Au Fou, in 1979.  It was reissued on CD, 180 gram vinyl LP and digital download by the bureau b label on August 12, 2011.

Track listing 
"Der Ruf aus der Ferne" - 5:16
"Am Stadtrand" - 5:13
"Zwei sind eins" - 3:26
"Auf des Tigers Spur" - 3:10
"Immergrün" - 2:52
"Wasser im Wind" - 5:20
"Kundmachung" - 2:45
"Heilsamer Brunnen" - 9:00
"Fenster Im Schnee" - 4:43

Personnel
 Hans-Joachim Roedelius - Composer, producer, synthesizer, percussion, piano, voice, sounds
 Alexander Czjzek - Saxophone, artwork, composer on "Am Stadtrand", "Immergrün" and "Wasser im Wind"
 Eric Spitzer-Marlyn - Guitar, bass guitar, engineer, composer on "Der Ruf aus der Ferne", "Auf des Tigers Spur" and "Heilsamer Brunnen"
 Christine Roedelius - Photography

Additional personnel, 2011 reissue

 Gunther Buskies - Reissue producer
 Thomas Worthmann - Reissue producer
 Willem Makkee - Digital remastering
 Asmus Tietchens - Liner notes 
 Gareth Davies - Liner notes translation 
 Kerstin Holzwarth - Reissue layout

References

Other resources 
 Album liner Notes

1982 albums
Hans-Joachim Roedelius albums